Wanitchaya Luangtonglang (RTGS:  Wanitchaya Luangthonglang, born October 8, 1992)  is a member of the Thailand women's national volleyball team.

Career
Luangtonglang won with her U18 team the 2008 Asian Championship  Bronze Medal. With her national senior team, she won the 2009 Asian Championship gold medal and the 2010 Asian Cup silver medal.

She is on the list 2019 Korea-Thailand all star super match competition.

Clubs 
  Nakhon Ratchasima (2008–)
  TMS-Philippine Army (2013–2014)
  Jakarta Elektrik (2016)

Awards

Individual 
 2010–11 Thailand League – "Best Scorer"
 2013 PSL Grand Prix – "Most Valuable Player"
 2015–16 Thailand League – "Best Scorer"

Clubs 
 2013 PSL Grand Prix –  Champion, with TMS-Philippine Army
 2013–14 Thailand League –  Champion, with Nakhon Ratchasima
 2017–18 Thailand League –  Runner-up, with Nakhon Ratchasima
 2018–19 Thailand League –  Champion, with Nakhon Ratchasima

References

Wanitchaya Luangtonglang
Wanitchaya Luangtonglang
1992 births
Living people
Wanitchaya Luangtonglang
Southeast Asian Games medalists in volleyball
Competitors at the 2011 Southeast Asian Games